Terence Alan Hurlock (born 22 September 1958) is an English former professional footballer who played as a central midfielder. Over the course of a 15-year career in the Football League, he had notable spells with Brentford and Millwall. He won England B international caps while with Millwall and is a member of the club's Hall of Fame. A physical player, Hurlock received seven red cards during his career and in 2007 was rated by The Times as the 23rd hardest player in football.

Playing career

Early years 
Hurlock was born in Hackney and started his football career as an associate schoolboy with West Ham United, becoming an apprentice in April 1975. He failed to progress at West Ham and was released at age 18. Hurlock dropped into non-league football and played for Isthmian League clubs Enfield and Leytonstone/Ilford.

Brentford 
After some attention from AFC Bournemouth manager David Webb, Hurlock joined Third Division club Brentford in August 1980 for a £10,000 fee. He immediately established himself in the midfield alongside Chris Kamara and Stan Bowles, making 42 league appearances and scoring four goals during the 1980–81 season. He flourished under Fred Callaghan's management and averaged over 44 league appearances a season, even after Callaghan was replaced by Frank McLintock. A hard player, Hurlock's long curly hair, earring and beard led the Brentford supporters to nickname him 'Gypo'. Callaghan managed to convince Hurlock to smarten his appearance, as Callaghan believed Hurlock's rough appearance was influencing referees to book him.

Hurlock captained the Bees to the 1985 Football League Trophy Final, which was lost 3–1 to Wigan Athletic. Hurlock departed Brentford in February 1986, having made 263 appearances and scored 24 goals. Looking back in 2002 on his time with the Bees, Hurlock said "I loved my time at the club and living in the town". In a Football League 125th anniversary poll, Hurlock was rated the fifth greatest-ever Brentford player and the club's fifth-greatest captain.

Reading 
Hurlock signed for high-flying Third Division club Reading in February 1986 in a £92,000 deal. He made 16 appearances during the remainder of the 1985–86 season and helped the Royals to the Third Division title and to Second Division football for the first time in 55 years. Hurlock's performances saw him named the Third Division PFA Team of the Year. He made 19 appearances in the Second Division before departing Elm Park on 12 February 1987. Hurlock made 35 appearances and scored no goals during his year with Reading. In 2002, Hurlock revealed that he failed to see eye-to-eye with manager Ian Branfoot, as he refused to relocate to Reading from his Brentford home.

Millwall 
Hurlock joined Second Division club Millwall for a £95,000 fee on 12 February 1987 and reunited with former Brentford assistant manager John Docherty, then-manager of the Lions. He made 13 appearances and scored one goal in what remained of the 1986–87 season, before making 33 appearances in the following campaign, helping the Lions to the Second Division championship and to top-flight football for the first time in the club's history. Nicknamed 'Terry Warlock' by the Millwall supporters, Hurlock showed impressive form during the 1988–89 season, making 40 appearances, scoring three goals and winning the club's Player of the Year award. He made a further 37 appearances during the 1989–90 season, a disastrous campaign in which Millwall were relegated back to the Second Division with a bottom-place finish in the First Division. Hurlock departed Millwall on 23 August 1990, having made 123 appearances and scored 10 goals during -years at The Den.

Rangers 
Hurlock moved to Scotland to sign for Scottish League Premier Division club Rangers on 23 August 1990 for a £375,000 fee. In one season at Ibrox, Hurlock made 35 appearances, scored two goals and won Premier Division and League Cup medals.

Southampton 
Hurlock returned to England to sign for First Division club Southampton on 9 September 1991 for a £400,000 fee. He made 36 appearances and scored two goals during the 1991–92 season and was part of the team which reached the 1992 Full Members Cup Final, losing 3–2 to Nottingham Forest after extra time. Hurlock made 33 appearances during the inaugural season of the new Premier League, before falling out of favour the following year departing in February 1994. He made 71 appearances and scored two goals in -years at The Dell.

Return to Millwall 
Hurlock dropped down to the First Division to rejoin high-flying Millwall on 25 February 1994 on a free transfer. He had an ignominious return to action with the Lions, lasting just nine minutes after being the first of three players sent off in a 0–0 draw with Leicester City on 6 March. Hurlock made 15 appearances during what remained of the 1993–94 season, helping the club to a third-place finish and a spot in the playoffs, but his season ended on a sour note after a 5–1 defeat on aggregate to Derby County in the semi-finals. Hurlock departed the club after the season and finished his Millwall career having made 138 appearances and scored 10 goals across his two spells. He is regarded with legend status amongst the Lions supporters and is a member of the club's Hall of Fame.

Fulham 
Hurlock signed for Third Division club Fulham in July 1994. He made 27 league appearances and scored one goal during the 1994–95 season, in which the Cottagers narrowly missed out on a place in the playoffs. Ahead of the 1995–96 season, Hurlock sustained a double leg break at the hands of Brentford defender Martin Grainger in a pre-season friendly between the two clubs. The injury forced him to retire from football at the age of 36. During his one season with Fulham, Hurlock set an unwanted record of 61 disciplinary points.

International career 
Hurlock's performances for Millwall in the First Division during the 1988–89 season saw him called into the England B squad for three friendlies in May 1989. He scored on his second appearance, opening the scoring in a 2–0 win over Iceland.

Quotes
 "I stayed away from him as much as possible!" – David Beckham recalls a match against Fulham during his loan spell at Preston North End
 "Some of us [Millwall players] were playfully goading Terry about what he was going to do to Vinnie Jones in the upcoming fixture with Wimbledon. Without saying a word, he got up from the table and walked to the entrance of the pub and ripped the door off its hinges" – Millwall teammate Tony Cascarino
 "Absolute hero. He was a very, very hard player, but a very, very intelligent player" – Millwall supporter Bob Crow
 "Intimidating? He just had to growl at the opposition and they'd be scared, but he was also a decent player" – Millwall teammate Teddy Sheringham
 Q: "What's your favourite animal?" A: "Terry Hurlock" – Millwall teammate Neil Ruddock
 "Hurlock was like Michael Bolton crossed with a pit-bull and was brought in to add some bite to the Saints midfield" – Chris Rann, Metro
 "I'd come here (Brentford) as a young professional and he just epitomised it. He was just a leader and I only thought – if I could emulate this fellow. He'd get press for his ruggedness and tough tackling, but he could play. Week in, week out, year after year Tel was ripping up trees for Brentford. He was a great player. If you're a poor player you aren't going to go on and play for Glasgow Rangers" – Brentford teammate Terry Evans

Personal life 
During his time with Brentford, Hurlock was convinced by chairman Martin Lange to buy a house next to the club's Griffin Park ground. He was friends with Millwall supporter Bob Crow and has worked for the RMT since 2012.

Career statistics

Honours
Reading
Football League Third Division: 1985–86

Millwall
Football League Second Division: 1987–88

Rangers
 Scottish League Premier Division: 1990–91
 Scottish League Cup: 1990–91

Southampton
Full Members Cup runner-up: 1991–92

Individual
Brentford Supporters' Player of the Year: 1980–81
 Brentford Players' Player of the Year: 1980–81
 Football League Third Division PFA Team of the Year: 1985–86
 Millwall Player of the Year: 1988–89
 Millwall Hall of Fame

References

External links

Living people
1958 births
England B international footballers
English footballers
Brentford F.C. players
Reading F.C. players
Millwall F.C. players
Rangers F.C. players
Southampton F.C. players
Fulham F.C. players
Enfield F.C. players
Premier League players
Footballers from the London Borough of Hackney
West Ham United F.C. players
English Football League players
Scottish Football League players
Redbridge Forest F.C. players
Isthmian League players
Association football midfielders